The 2022 Rally de Portugal (also known as the Vodafone Rally de Portugal 2022) was a motor racing event for rally cars held over four days between 19 and 22 May 2022. It marked the fifty-fifth running of the Rally de Portugal. The event was the fourth round of the 2022 World Rally Championship, World Rally Championship-2 and World Rally Championship-3.

Elfyn Evans and Scott Martin were the defending rally winners. Their team, Toyota Gazoo Racing WRT, were the defending manufacturers' winners. Esapekka Lappi and Janne Ferm were the defending rally winners in the WRC-2 category. Kajetan Kajetanowicz and Maciej Szczepaniak were the defending rally winners in the WRC-3 category, with the Latvian crew of Mārtiņš Sesks and Francis Renars were the defending title-holders in the junior class.

Kalle Rovanperä and Jonne Halttunen won a hat-trick victory. Their team, Toyota Gazoo Racing WRT, successfully defended their title. Yohan Rossel and Valentin Sarreaud won the World Rally Championship-2 category. Sami Pajari and Enni Mälkönen won the World Rally Championship-3 category as well as the junior class.

Background

Entry list
The following crews entered into the rally. The event opened to crews competing in the World Rally Championship, its support categories, the World Rally Championship-2 and World Rally Championship-3, and privateer entries that were not registered to score points in any championship. Twelve entered under Rally1 regulations, as were forty-one Rally2 crews in the World Rally Championship-2 and seven Rally3 crews in the World Rally Championship-3.

Itinerary
All dates and times are in WEST (UTC+1).

Report

WRC Rally1

Classification

Special stages

Championship standings

WRC-2 Rally2

Classification

Special stages

Championship standings

WRC-3 Rally3

Classification

Special stages

Championship standings

Notes

References

External links
  
 2022 Rally de Portugal at eWRC-results.com
 2022 Rally de Portugal at rally-maps.com 

Portugal
2022 in Portuguese motorsport
May 2022 sports events in Portugal
2022